The 2011 Commonwealth Youth Games, officially known as the IV Commonwealth Youth Games, and commonly known as Isle Of Man 2011, is a multi-sport event which took place from 7 to 13 September 2011 in the British Crown Dependency of Isle of Man. As per the original quadrennial cycle, the Games were scheduled for 2012. However, the Commonwealth Games Federation at its general assembly in 2005 decided to move the Games within one year before the Summer Olympics. The Bowl Stadium at the National Sports Centre, Douglas staged the opening ceremony on 7 September 2011. The closing ceremony was held on Douglas Promenade & the Villa Marina on 13 September.

Host city selection
Isle of Man had unsuccessfully bid to host the 2008 Commonwealth Youth Games, losing to the bid of India for Pune.

Venues
In October 2008 the organising committee released a provisional events programme. All events were held between September 9 and 11, 2011

National Sports Centre, Douglas -  The athletics stadium staged all the athletics events. The swimming pool staged the swimming events and the main Sports Hall staged badminton.
The Bowl Stadium, Douglas - Rugby sevens.
The Villa Marina, Douglas - Boxing.
Ellan Vannin Gymnastics Club - Gymnastics (boys).
Manx Gymnastics Centre of Excellence - Gymnastics (girls).
The start line for the 3 cycling races will be: TT Grandstand for the Road Race & Douglas Promenade for the Criterium & Time Trial.

Sports
The 2011 Commonwealth Youth Games program featured seven sports, two fewer from previous Games in Pune.

Participating nations
64 commonwealth nations competed at the 2011 Commonwealth Youth Games. Fiji was barred from the Games as it was suspended from the Commonwealth. Both Norfolk Island and Vanuatu withdrew from the competition, as both Norfolk Island competitors were injured, and the latter cited other sporting commitments, followed by Lesotho and Montserrat for similar reasons. Ghana, Nigeria and Tuvalu were scheduled to compete at the Games, however they did not appear on the start lists.

The number of athletes per country is in brackets.

 (5)

 (8)
 (4)
 (13)
 (4)
 (8)
 (8)
 (5)
 (3)
 (8)

 (4)
 (3)
 (11)
 (4)
 (78)
 (5)
 (4)

 (5)
 (4)
 (8)
 (7)
 (20)
 (33) 
 (11)
 (7)
 (20)
 (6)

 (3)
 (18)
 (4)
 (5)
 (5)

 (3)
 (8)
 (3)
 (29)

 (1)
 (19)
 (4)
 (8)
 (4)
 (4)
 (3)
 (5)
 (4)
 (3)
 (50)
 (7)
 (4)
 (6)
 (4)

 (25)
 (4)
 (1)
 (4)
 (22)
 (3)

 (11)
 (32)
 (6)

Schedule

Medal table

Country codes.
Key

References

External links
Isle of Man Government Infocentre announcement
Isle of Man Commonwealth Youth Games Website

 
Commonwealth Youth Games
Youth sport in the Isle of Man
Commonwealth Youth Games
Commonwealth Youth Games
Multi-sport events in the Isle of Man
International sports competitions hosted by the Isle of Man
2011 in youth sport